The Swedish Swimming Championships are held annually in the Swedish summer in outdoor 50 m pool. The championships sometimes also works as trials for the Summer Olympics, World Championships and European Championships. Swimmers representing Swedish swim teams may participate.

History
The first Swedish Swimming Championship was held in 1899 and in the beginning the championships were held in lakes or seas. During the 1920s and 1930s next to all championships were held in Eriksdalsbadet in Stockholm, but when it was demolished the championships started to move around Sweden.

Since 1988 the Senior's and Junior's Swedish Championships are hosted together with timed finals for the Junior's in the morning together with the prelims for the older swimmer.

The swimmer with the most individual gold medals is Anders Holmertz with 39 titles, before Therese Alshammar with 34, Arne Borg with 30, Lars Frölander with 27 titles and Robert Andersson with 24 titles. Of them, Therese Alshammar and Lars Frölander are the only swimmer still active.

Champions

Venues

See also
List of Swedish Swimming Championships champions
Swedish Swimming Grand Prix series
Swedish Short Course Swimming Championships
List of sporting events in Sweden

References

Swimming competitions in Sweden
National swimming competitions
Recurring sporting events established in 1899
National championships in Sweden